Zapparia or Kar Sipar, was an ancient city in Assyrian period located in modern Zebari region in Iraqi Kurdistan.

References

Ancient Assyrian cities